The 2019–20 Portland Pilots men's basketball team represented the University of Portland during the 2019–20 NCAA Division I men's basketball season. The Pilots, led by fourth-year head coach Terry Porter, played their home games at the Chiles Center as members of the West Coast Conference. They finished the season 9–23, 1–15 in WCC play to finish in last place. They lost in the first round of the WCC tournament to Santa Clara.

Previous season 
The Pilots finished the 2018–19 season 7–25, 0-16 in WCC play to finish in last place. They lost in the first round of the WCC tournament to San Diego.

Offseason

Departures

Incoming transfers

Recruiting class of 2019

Roster

Schedule and results
 
|-
!colspan=9 style=| Exhibition

|-
!colspan=9 style=| Non-conference regular season

|-
!colspan=9 style=| WCC regular season

|-
!colspan=9 style=| WCC tournament

Source: Schedule

References

Portland
Portland Pilots men's basketball seasons
Portland Pilots men's basketball
Portland Pilots men's basketball
Port
Port